National Paralympic Committee of Bangladesh (NPC Bangladesh)

Initially an organization named National Games for Disabled Association (NGDA) which was registered by District Social Welfare office under the controlling of the Ministry of Social Welfare started sports activities in Dhaka. But since long time it was an inactive organization. In 2003 District Social Welfare office took over the charge of this organization and announced an election as per the constitutional provision. After the election handed over the charge of the organization to the Executive Committees where A.S.M. Mofazzal Hossian and Engineer Md. Maksudur Rahman was the General Secretary respectively.

National Paralympic Committee (NPC Bangladesh) is the only national sports organization for the persons with disability which is affiliated by National Sports Council (NSC) and Ministry of Youth and Sports so that the organization could represent before the International Paralympic Committee (IPC).  As per the 1st condition of the membership criteria of International Paralympic Committee (IPC), National Sports Council/National Olympic Committee's recognition is must. National Games for Disabled Association (NGDA) which was registered by District Social Welfare office under the controlling of the Ministry of Social Welfare somehow could able to convinced and got IPC Membership in 2004 and then represent as NPC Bangladesh in the Paralymic Games Seul-2004.

According to the decision taken in the IPC GA Beijing,2005 it was mandatory to include the ward 'Para' in title of the name of organization, otherwise NPC has to be lost IPC Membership. Base on IPC's this decision National Games for Disabled Association (NGDA) its name as 'National Paralympic Committee of Bangladesh (NPC Bangladesh)' as per the guideline of IPC. Based on submitted related papers IPC's membership was continued as 'National Paralympic Committee of Bangladesh (NPC Bangladesh)' and represent Bangladesh in Paralympic Games Beijing,2008. In early 2012 District Social Welfare office (Registration authority) inform us that as per arlicle 4(3) of the Social Welfare Organization (Registration & Control) Ordinance 1961, Title of the organization couldn't be changed and suggested to apply for registration as new organization. As per our application and their guideline 'National Paralympic Committee of Bangladesh (NPC Bangladesh)' also a registered organization (Reg. No. Da-09000).

NPC Bangladesh was formed with some renowned sports back grounded persons and applied for affiliation of local Olympic Association as well as to IPC. This created confusions to IPC. In this scenario IPC faced a problem to identify the real one as country representative. IPC referred this matter to the Ministry of Youth & Sports to find out and solve which one is the real organization for disabled sport representing the country. In the meantime IPC temporarily suspended the membership of Bangladesh. To solve this matter government formed a new organization 'National Paralympic Committee of Bangladesh with a committee. Ministry of Youth & Sports also informed IPC HQ by a separate letter that NPC Bangladesh is only government recognized body to represent Bangladesh before the International Paralympic Committee (IPC). After that letter IPC sent some forms and papers to the newly formed NPC Bangladesh. As per the IPC guide line NPC Bangladesh has prepared a constitution of this organization which is already been approved by National Sports Council (NSC) and IPC. Hopefully, IPC approved constitution will be reached through our Ministry of Youth and Sport very soon and then IPC will process NPC Bangladesh membership.

Bangladesh made its Paralympic Games début at the 2004 Summer Paralympics in Athens, sending a single representative (Mokshud Mokshud) to compete in athletics. Mokshud entered only the men's 400m T46 sprint, and failed to advance past the heats, clocking by far the slowest time. In 1:15.90, he was the only athlete to run the race in more than a minute. In 2008, the country once more had a single representative, Abdul Quader Suman. Visually impaired Suman ran the men's 100m sprint in the T12 category, and recorded the slowest time in the heats (16.63s), thus finishing his participation in the Games.

Bangladesh has never taken part in the Winter Paralympics.

Full results for Bangladesh at the Paralympics

See also
 Bangladesh at the Olympics

References